FEDS Zhubei is a shopping mall located in Zhubei City, Hsinchu County, Taiwan that opened on 14 January 2022. This is the 13th store of the Far Eastern Department Stores company.

History
 On June 22, 2017, the mall started construction.
 On January 14, 2022, the mall started trial operations.

Design
The overall building incorporates the characteristics of Hakka culture, presenting the architectural image of a Hakka walled village, and a sky garden is planned on the ninth level of the mall.

Gallery

See also
 List of tourist attractions in Taiwan
 FEDS Xinyi A13

References

External links

2022 establishments in Taiwan
Shopping malls in Zhubei
Shopping malls established in 2022
Buildings and structures in Hsinchu County